Lutuhyne is a city in the Luhansk Raion of Luhansk Oblast (region) of Eastern Ukraine, Donbas.

From mid-April 2014 pro-Russian separatists captured several towns in Luhansk Oblast, including Lutuhyne. On 27 July 2014, Ukrainian forces claimed their troops had entered the city, and would restore Ukrainian control, yet by autumn it was clear that Lutuhyne was under the control of the pro-Russian, self-declared Lugansk People's Republic, and would remain that way from autumn 2014 on.   Following the 2022 annexation referendums in Russian-occupied Ukraine, Russia has claimed the settlement as their territory.

Demographics
Native language as of the Ukrainian Census of 2001:
Russian  56.93%
Ukrainian  42.35%
Armenian  0.26%
Belarusian  0.06%

Gallery

References

Cities in Luhansk Oblast
Cities of district significance in Ukraine
Lutuhyne Raion
Populated places established in the Russian Empire